The karate events of World Games I were held on July 25–27, 1981, at the Toso Pavilion on the campus of Santa Clara  University in California, United States. These were the first World Games, an international quadrennial multi-sport event, and were hosted by the city of city of Santa Clara. It was anticipated that Japanese athletes would perform well at karate. They did so by winning 12 medals among the nine events, including five gold medals.

Medalists
Sources:

Details

Women

Kata

 Final  – 1. Susuko Okamura, Japan, 65.4 points    2. Mie Nakayama, Japan, 65.3    3. Maria V. Moreno, Spain, 64.3.

Men
Considering that the losing athletes in both semifinals received bronze medals, it is unclear why there was a "bronze medal match" contested between them in each kumite classification.

Kata

 Final  – 1. K. Okada, Japan, 46.8 points   2. M. Kayama, Japan, 46.6    3. Domingo Llanos, USA, 46.2

Kumite 60kg

Eliminations – Pool A: M. Aikawa, Japan d. Tony Gunawan, Indonesia; G. D’Amico, Italy d. Giovanni Aguelo, Venezuela; Fernando Rosuero, Spain, bye; J. Tierney, England d. R. Situmeang, Indonesia.

Pool B: Jorge Castelli, Spain d. Gino McCulley, USA; M. Naito, Japan d. M. Gusti, Indonesia; Ivan Perez, Guatemala d. Rafael Franco, Dominican Republic; G. Tinniriello, Italy d. Chui Ching-Yen, Chinese Taipei

 Final  – Mayayuki Naito, Japan, d. Fernando Rosuero, Spain for gold medal; Joseph Tierney, Britain, d. Giuseppe Tinnirello, Italy, for bronze.

Kumite 60-65kg

Eliminations – Pool A: Tsai Ming-Shien, Chinese Taipei d. Cleveland Baxter, USA; Roberto DeLuca, Italy d. A. Pichardo, Dominican Republic; Z. Ono, Japan d. Ramon Malave, Sweden; Norbert Ayssi, France, bye

Pool B: Ricardo Abad, Spain d. Joseph Goffin, France; B.T. Maeda, Japan, bye; K. Yokouchi, Japan d. Ed DiNardo, USA; Eligio Martina, Curaçao d. Rustan Umbas, Indonesia

 Final  – Zenichi Ono, Japan, d. Toshiahi Maeda, Japan, for gold; Roberto De Luca, Italy, d. Kasayoshi Yokouchi, Japan, for bronze.

Kumite 65-70kg

 Final  – Cecil Hackett, Britain, d. Bernard Bilicky, France, for gold; Yukiyoshi Marutani, Japan, d. Seiji Nishimura, Japan, for bronze.

Kumite 70-75kg

 Final  – Lin Chin, Taiwan, d. Fred Royers, Netherlands, for gold; Angel Lopez, Spain, d. Christian Gouze, France, for bronze.

Kumite 75-80kg

 Final  – Osamu Kamikado, Japan d. Hisao Murase, Japan, for gold; Tokey Hill, USA d. John Roethoff, Netherlands, for bronze.

Kumite +80kg

 Final  – Ludwig Katzebue, Netherlands d. Chien Chen, Chinese Taipei, for gold; Claudio Guazzaroni, Italy d. Francisco Torres, Spain, for bronze.

Heavyweight

 Final  – Victor Charles, England d. Marc Pyree, France, for gold; Billy Banks, USA d. Claude Petinella, France, for bronze.

References

1981 World Games
1981
1981 in karate